Saqsolu (also Romanized as Sāqşolū) is a village in Dowlatabad Rural District, in the Central District of Namin County, Ardabil Province, Iran. At the 2006 census, its population was 603, in 123 families.

References 

Towns and villages in Namin County